The 2006 World U-17 Hockey Challenge was an ice hockey tournament for under-17 players held in  Saskatchewan, Canada between December 29, 2005 and January 4, 2006. Canada Quebec defeated the United States 5–2 in the final to claim the gold medal, while the Czech Republic defeated Canada Pacific 5–4 in a shootout to capture the bronze medal.

Games were held in Balgonie, Fort Qu'Appelle, Indian Head, Milestone, Moose Jaw, Regina, Southey, and Weyburn.

Challenge results

Preliminary round

Group A

Group B

Final round

Final standings

External links
Official website

U-17
U-17
U-17
U-17
U-17
U-17
Ice hockey competitions in Saskatchewan
World U-17 Hockey Challenge
International ice hockey competitions hosted by Canada